Heights is the fifth studio album by American pop rock band Walk the Moon, released on November 12, 2021, through RCA Records. The album is Walk the Moon's first studio album to be recorded since bassist Kevin Ray left the band in December 2020.

Background 

On July 14, 2021, the band released the lead single "Can You Handle My Love??", alongside two promotional singles "I'm Good" and "Giants". In frontman Nicholas Petricca's words, "the album is buttressed by songs that are eight or nine years old, and that the band writes a lot of songs for each record, so there's a lot of material that doesn't get used, and it's not because we don't love those babies. Sometimes it takes a while for them to grow up, or for us to find the right way to really bring them to life."
 
In September 2021, the band released their second single, "Fire in Your House", which features South-African musician Johnny Clegg, along with his son Jesse. It was released alongside the promotional single "DNA (The Keys)".
 
On October 27, 2021, the band released "Rise Up" as the third single from the album.

Track listing

Personnel

Walk the Moon
 Nicholas Petricca – lead vocals, keyboards, producer 
 Eli Maiman – bass, guitar, backing vocals
 Sean Waugaman – drums, percussion, backing vocals

Additional personnel

 Neal Avron – mixing
 Captain Cuts - producer
 Dan Chertoff – A&R
 Jeff Clegg — featured artist 
 Johnny Clegg – acoustic guitar, featured artist, vocals
 Mike Crossey – producer 
 Tommy English – producer 
 Chris Gehringer – mastering
 Clare Gillen – creative direction

 Carter Jahan – engineer
 Jonas Jeberg – producer 
 Wyatt Knowles – cover design 
 Ryan McMahon – bass
 Paul Meany – keyboards, producer 
 Alex Pasco – engineer 
 Stephen Sesso – engineer 
 Scott Skrzynski – mixing assistance
 Grant Spanier – photography

References

 

 
2021 albums
Albums produced by Mike Crossey
Albums produced by Tommy English (producer)
Albums produced by Jonas Jeberg
RCA Records albums
Walk the Moon albums